Burnt Knob is a mountain in Greene County, New York. It is located in the Catskill Mountains southeast of South Durham. Acra Point is located east-southeast, and Blackhead is located south-southeast of Burnt Knob.

References

Mountains of Greene County, New York
Mountains of New York (state)